See History of the Republic of Turkey for the history of the modern state.

The history of Turkey, understood as the history of the region now forming the territory of the Republic of Turkey, includes the history of both Anatolia (the Asian part of Turkey) and Eastern Thrace (the European part of Turkey). These two previously politically distinct regions came under control of the Roman Empire in the second century BC, eventually becoming the core of the Roman Byzantine Empire. For times predating the Ottoman period, a distinction should also be made between the history of the Turkic peoples, and the history of the territories now forming the Republic of Turkey From the time when parts of what is now Turkey were conquered by the Seljuq dynasty, the history of Turkey spans the medieval history of the Seljuk Empire, the medieval to modern history of the Ottoman Empire, and the history of the Republic of Turkey since the 1920s.

Prehistory

Human habitation in Anatolia dates back to the Paleolithic. The earliest representations of culture in Anatolia were Stone Age artifacts. Artifacts from the Paleolithic era have been found scattered through Anatolia, and many are currently housed in the Museum of Anatolian Civilizations in Ankara, in the Archaeological Museum in Antalya, and in other Turkish institutions. 

Göbekli Tepe is the site of the oldest known man-made structure, a temple dating to circa 10,000 BC, while Çatalhöyük is a very large Neolithic and Chalcolithic settlement in Anatolia, which existed from approximately 7500 BC to 5700 BC. It is the largest and best-preserved Neolithic site found to date. Nevalı Çori was an early Neolithic settlement on the middle Euphrates, in Şanlıurfa. The Urfa Man statue is dated c. 9000 BC, to the period of the Pre-Pottery Neolithic, and is defined as "the oldest known naturalistic life-sized sculpture of a human". It is considered to be contemporaneous with Göbekli Tepe. The settlement of Troy started in the Neolithic Age and continued into the Iron Age.

Bronze Age civilization started to appear in Anatolia in the middle of the 1st millennium BC. The earliest representations of culture in Anatolia can be found in several archaeological sites located in the central and eastern part of the region. Stone Age artifacts such as animal bones and food fossils were found at Burdur (north of Antalya). Although the origins of some of the earliest peoples are shrouded in mystery, the remnants of Bronze Age civilizations, such as the Hattians, the Akkadian Empire, Assyria, and the Hittites, provide us with many examples of the daily lives of its citizens and their trade. After the fall of the Hittites, the new Greek states of Phrygia and Lydia developed on the western coast as the  classical Greek Aegean civilization began to flourish.

Anatolia and Thrace in classical antiquity

Classical Anatolia

The classical  history of Anatolia (Asia Minor) can be roughly subdivided into the classical period and Hellenistic Anatolia, ending with the conquest of the region by the Roman empire in the second century BC.

After the fall of the Hittites, the new states of Phrygia and Lydia stood strong on the western coast as Greek civilization began to flourish. They, and all the rest of Anatolia were relatively soon after incorporated into the Achaemenid Persian Empire.

As Persia grew in strength, their system of local government in Anatolia allowed many port cities to grow and to become wealthy. All of Anatolia got divided into various satrapies, ruled by satraps (governors) appointed by the central Persian rulers. The first state that was called Armenia by neighbouring peoples was the state of the Armenian Orontid dynasty, which included parts of eastern Turkey beginning in the 6th century BC, which became the Satrapy of Armenia under Achaemenid rule. Some of the satraps revolted periodically but did not pose a serious threat. In the 5th century BC, Darius I built the Royal Road, which linked the principal city of Susa with the west Anatolian city of Sardis. 

Anatolia played a pivotal role in Achaemenid history. In the earliest 5th century BC, some of the Ionian cities under Persian rule revolted, which culminated into the Ionian Revolt. This revolt, after being easily suppressed by the Persian authority, laid the direct uplead for the Greco-Persian Wars, which turned out to be one of the most crucial wars in European history.

Achaemenid Persian rule in Anatolia ended with the conquests of Alexander the Great, defeating Darius III between 334 and 330 BC. Alexander wrested control of the whole region from Persia in successive battles. After Alexander's death, his conquests were split amongst several of his trusted generals, but were under constant threat of invasion from both the Gauls and other powerful rulers in Pergamon, Pontus, and Egypt. The Seleucid Empire, the largest of Alexander's territories, and which included Anatolia, became involved in a disastrous war with Rome culminating in the battles of Thermopylae and Magnesia. The resulting  Treaty of Apamea in (188 BC) saw the Seleucids retreat from Anatolia. The Kingdom of Pergamum and the Republic of Rhodes, Rome's allies in the war, were granted the former Seleucid lands in Anatolia.

Roman control of Anatolia was strengthened by a 'hands off' approach by Rome, allowing local control to govern effectively and providing military protection. In the early 4th century, Constantine the Great established a new administrative centre at Constantinople, and by the end of the 4th century the Roman empire split into two parts, the Eastern part (Romania) with Constantinople as its capital, referred to by historians as the Byzantine Empire from the original name, Byzantium.

Thrace

The Thracians were a group of Indo-European tribes inhabiting a large area in Central and Southeastern Europe. They were bordered by the Scythians to the north, the Celts and the Illyrians to the west, the Ancient Greeks to the south and the Black Sea to the east. They spoke the Thracian language – a scarcely attested branch of the Indo-European language family. The study of Thracians and Thracian culture is known as Thracology.

Starting around 1200 BC, the western coast of Anatolia was heavily settled by Aeolian and Ionian Greeks. Numerous important cities were founded by these colonists, such as Miletus, Ephesus, Smyrna and Byzantium, the latter founded by Greek colonists from Megara in 657 BC. All of Thrace, and the native Thracian peoples were conquered by Darius the Great in the late 6th century BC, and were re-subjugated into the empire in 492 BC following Mardonius' campaign during the First Persian invasion of Greece. The territory of Thrace later became unified by the Odrysian kingdom, founded by Teres I, probably after the Persian defeat in Greece.

By the 5th century BC, the Thracian presence was pervasive enough to have made Herodotus call them the second-most numerous people in the part of the world known by him (after the Indians), and potentially the most powerful, if not for their lack of unity. The Thracians in classical times were broken up into a large number of groups and tribes, though a number of powerful Thracian states were organized, such as the Odrysian kingdom of Thrace and the Dacian kingdom of Burebista. A type of soldier of this period called the Peltast probably originated in Thrace.

Before the expansion of the Kingdom of Macedon, Thrace was divided into three camps (East, Central, and West) after the withdrawal of the Persians following their eventual defeat in mainland Greece. Cersobleptes, a notable ruler of the East Thracians, attempted to expand his authority over many of the Thracian tribes but was eventually defeated by the Macedonians.

The Thracians were typically not city-builders. The largest Thracian cities were in fact large villages and the only polis was Seuthopolis.

Byzantine Period

The Persian Achaemenid Empire fell to Alexander the Great in 334 BC, which led to increasing cultural homogeneity and Hellenization in the area. Following Alexander's death in 323 BC, Anatolia was subsequently divided into a number of small Hellenistic kingdoms, all of which became part of the Roman Republic by the mid-1st century BC. The process of Hellenization that began with Alexander's conquest accelerated under Roman rule, and by the early centuries AD the local Anatolian languages and cultures had become extinct, being largely replaced by ancient Greek language and culture.

In 324, Constantine I chose Byzantium to be the new capital of the Roman Empire, renaming it New Rome. Following the death of Theodosius I in 395 and the permanent division of the Roman Empire between his two sons, the city, which would popularly come to be known as Constantinople became the capital of the Eastern Roman Empire. This, which would later be branded by historians as the Byzantine Empire, ruled most of the territory of what is today Turkey until the Late Middle Ages, while the other remaining territory remained in Sassanid Persian hands.

Between the 3rd and 7th century AD, the Byzantines and the neighboring Sassanids frequently clashed over possession of Anatolia, which significantly exhausted both empires, thus laying the way open for the eventual Muslim conquests from both empires' respective south.

The borders of the empire fluctuated through several cycles of decline and recovery. During the reign of Justinian I, the empire reached its greatest extent after the fall of the west, re-conquering much of the historically Roman western Mediterranean coast, including Africa, Italy and Rome, which it held for two more centuries. The Byzantine–Sasanian War of 602–628 exhausted the empire's resources, and during the early Muslim conquests of the 7th century, it lost its richest provinces, Egypt and Syria, to the Rashidun Caliphate. It then lost Africa to the Umayyads in 698, before the empire was rescued by the Isaurian dynasty.

The fall of Constantinople to the Ottoman Empire in 1453 marked the end of the Byzantine Empire. Refugees fleeing the city after its capture would settle in Italy and other parts of Europe, helping to ignite the Renaissance. The Empire of Trebizond was conquered eight years later when its eponymous capital surrendered to Ottoman forces after it was besieged in 1461. The last Byzantine rump state, the Principality of Theodoro, was conquered by the Ottomans in 1475.

Early history of the Turks

Historians generally agree that the first Turkic people lived in a region extending from Central Asia to Siberia. Historically they were established after the 6th century BC. The earliest separate Turkic peoples appeared on the peripheries of the late Xiongnu confederation about 200 BC (contemporaneous with the Chinese Han Dynasty). 
The first mention of Turks was in a Chinese text that mentioned trade of Turk tribes with the Sogdians along the Silk Road.

It has often been suggested that the Xiongnu, mentioned in Han Dynasty records, were Proto-Turkic speakers.

The Hun hordes of Attila, who invaded and conquered much of Europe in the 5th century AD, may have been Turkic and descendants of the Xiongnu. Some scholars argue that the Huns were one of the earlier Turkic tribes, while others argue that they were of Mongolic origin.

In the 6th century, 400 years after the collapse of northern Xiongnu power in Inner Asia, leadership of the Turkic peoples was taken over by the Göktürks. Formerly in the Xiongnu nomadic confederation, the Göktürks inherited their traditions and administrative experience. From 552 to 745, Göktürk leadership united the nomadic Turkic tribes into the Göktürk Empire.  The name derives from gok, "blue" or "celestial".  Unlike its Xiongnu predecessor, the Göktürk Khanate had its temporary khans from the Ashina clan that were subordinate to a sovereign authority controlled by a council of tribal chiefs.  The Khanate retained elements of its original shamanistic religion, Tengriism, although it received missionaries of Buddhist monks and practiced a syncretic religion. The Göktürks were the first Turkic people to write Old Turkic in a runic script, the Orkhon script. The Khanate was also the first state known as "Turk". Towards the end of the century, the Göktürks Khanate was split in two; i.e., Eastern Turkic Khaganate and Western Turkic Khaganate. The Tang Empire conquered the Eastern Turkic Khaganate in 630 and the Western Turkic Khaganate in 657 in a series of military campaigns. However in 681 the khanate was revived. The Göktürks eventually collapsed due to a series of dynastic conflicts, but the name "Turk" was later taken by many states and peoples. 

Turkic peoples and related groups migrated west from Turkestan and what is now Mongolia towards Eastern Europe, Iranian plateau and Anatolia and modern Turkey in many waves. The date of the initial expansion remains unknown.  After many battles, they established their own state and later created the Ottoman Empire. The main migration occurred in medieval times, when they spread across most of Asia and into Europe and the Middle East. They also participated in the Crusades.

Seljuk Empire

The Seljuq Turkmens created a medieval empire that controlled a vast area stretching from the Hindu Kush to eastern Anatolia and from Central Asia to the Persian Gulf. From their homelands near the Aral sea, the Seljuqs advanced first into Khorasan and then into mainland Persia before eventually conquering eastern Anatolia.

The Seljuq/Seljuk empire was founded by Tughril Beg (1016-1063) in 1037. Tughril was raised by his grandfather, Seljuk-Beg Seljuk gave his name to both the Seljuk empire and the Seljuk dynasty. The Seljuqs united the fractured political scene of the eastern Islamic world and played a key role in the first and second crusades. Highly Persianized in culture and language, the Seljuqs also played an important role in the development of the Turko-Persian tradition, even exporting Persian culture to Anatolia.

Ottoman Empire

The Ottoman beylik's first capital was located in Bursa in 1326. Edirne which was conquered in 1361 was the next capital city. After largely expanding to Europe and Anatolia, in 1453, the Ottomans nearly completed the conquest of the Byzantine Empire by capturing its capital, Constantinople during the reign of Mehmed II. Constantinople was made the capital city of the Empire following Edirne. The Ottoman Empire would continue to expand into the Eastern Anatolia, Central Europe, the Caucasus, North and East Africa, the islands in the Mediterranean, Greater Syria, Mesopotamia, and the Arabian peninsula in the 15th, 16th and 17th centuries.

The Ottoman Empire's power and prestige peaked in the 16th and 17th centuries, particularly during the reign of Suleiman the Magnificent. The empire was often at odds with the Holy Roman Empire in its steady advance towards Central Europe through the Balkans and the southern part of the Polish–Lithuanian Commonwealth. In addition, the Ottomans were often at war with Persia over territorial disputes, which allowed them to inherit the Timurid Renaissance. At sea, the empire contended with the Holy Leagues, composed of Habsburg Spain, the Republic of Venice and the Knights of St. John, for control of the Mediterranean. In the Indian Ocean, the Ottoman navy frequently confronted Portuguese fleets in order to defend its traditional monopoly over the maritime trade routes between East Asia and Western Europe; these routes faced new competition with the Portuguese discovery of the Cape of Good Hope in 1488. The Ottomans even had influence in Southeast Asia as the Ottomans sent soldiers to their most distant vassal, the Sultanate of Aceh at Sumatra in Indonesia. Their forces in Aceh were opposed by the Portuguese that had crossed the Atlantic and Indian Oceans invaded the Sultanate of Malacca and the Spaniards who had crossed from Latin America and invaded formerly Muslim Manila in the Philippines, as these Iberian powers waged a world war against the Ottoman Caliphate known as the Ottoman–Habsburg wars.

The Treaty of Karlowitz in 1699 marked the beginning of Ottoman territorial retreat; some territories were lost by the treaty: Austria received all of Hungary and Transylvania except the Banat; Venice obtained most of Dalmatia along with the Morea (the Peloponnesus peninsula in southern Greece); Poland recovered Podolia. Throughout the 19th and early 20th centuries, the Ottoman Empire continued losing its territories, including Greece, Algeria, Tunisia, Libya and the Balkans in the 1912–1913 Balkan Wars. Anatolia remained multi-ethnic until the early 20th century (see Rise of Nationalism under the Ottoman Empire). Its inhabitants were of varied ethnicities, including Turks, Armenians, Assyrians, Kurds, Greeks, French, and Italians (particularly from Genoa and Venice). Faced with territorial losses on all sides the Ottoman Empire under the rule of the Three Pashas forged an alliance with Germany who supported it with troops and equipment. The Ottoman Empire entered World War I (1914–1918) on the side of the Central Powers and was ultimately defeated. Following World War I, the huge conglomeration of territories and peoples that formerly comprised the Ottoman Empire was divided into several new states.

On October 30, 1918, the Armistice of Mudros was signed, followed by the imposition of Treaty of Sèvres on August 10, 1920 by Allied Powers, which was never ratified. The Treaty of Sèvres would break up the Ottoman Empire and force large concessions on territories of the Empire in favour of Greece, Italy, Britain and France.

Republic of Turkey

The occupation of some parts of the country by the Allies in the aftermath of World War I prompted the establishment of the Turkish national movement. Under the leadership of Mustafa Kemal, a military commander who had distinguished himself during the Battle of Gallipoli, the Turkish War of Independence was waged with the aim of revoking the terms of the Treaty of Sèvres. By September 18, 1922, the occupying armies were expelled. On November 1, the newly founded parliament formally abolished the Sultanate, thus ending 623 years of Ottoman rule. The Treaty of Lausanne of July 24, 1923, led to the international recognition of the sovereignty of the newly formed "Republic of Turkey" as the successor state of the Ottoman Empire, and the republic was officially proclaimed on October 29, 1923, in the new capital of Ankara. Mustafa Kemal became the republic's first President of Turkey and subsequently introduced many radical reforms with the aim of founding a new Secular Republic from the remnants of its Ottoman past. The Ottoman fez was abolished, full rights for women politically were established, and new writing system for Turkish based upon the Latin alphabet was created.
According to the Law on Family Names, the Turkish parliament presented Mustafa Kemal with the honorific surname "Atatürk" (Father of the Turks) in 1934.

Turkey was neutral in World War II (1939–45) but signed a treaty with Britain in October 1939 that said Britain would defend Turkey if Germany attacked it. An invasion was threatened in 1941 but did not happen and Ankara refused German requests to allow troops to cross its borders into Syria or the USSR. Germany had been its largest trading partner before the war, and Turkey continued to do business with both sides. It purchased arms from both sides. The Allies tried to stop German purchases of chrome (used in making better steel). Starting in 1942 the Allies provided military aid. The Turkish leaders conferred with Roosevelt and Churchill at the Cairo Conference in November, 1943, and promised to enter the war. By August 1944, with Germany nearing defeat, Turkey broke off relations. In February 1945, it declared war on Germany and Japan, a symbolic move that allowed Turkey to join the nascent United Nations.

Meanwhile, relations with Moscow worsened, setting stage for the start of the Cold War. The demands by the Soviet Union for military bases in the Turkish Straits, prompted the United States to declare the Truman Doctrine in 1947. The doctrine enunciated American intentions to guarantee the security of Turkey and Greece, and resulted in large-scale U.S. military and economic support.

After participating with the United Nations forces in the Korean War, Turkey joined NATO in 1952, becoming a bulwark against Soviet expansion into the Mediterranean. Following a decade of intercommunal violence on the island of Cyprus and the Greek military coup of July 1974, overthrowing President Makarios and installing Nikos Sampson as a dictator, Turkey invaded the Republic of Cyprus in 1974. Nine years later the Turkish Republic of Northern Cyprus (TRNC) was established. Turkey is the only country that recognises the TRNC

The one-party period was followed by multi-party democracy after 1945. The Turkish democracy was interrupted by military coups d'état in 1960, 1971 and 1980. In 1984, the PKK began an insurgency against the Turkish government; the conflict, which has claimed over 40,000 lives, continues today. Since the liberalization of the Turkish economy during the 1980s, the country has enjoyed stronger economic growth and greater political stability.

In August 2014, Turkish Prime Minister Recep Tayyip Erdogan won Turkey's first direct presidential election.

In July 2016, the Turkish attempted coup took place. A number of rogue government units took over and were only repelled after a few hours.

In December 2016, an off duty policeman Mevlut Altintas shot dead the Russian Ambassador inside an Art Gallery. He refused to surrender and was then shot dead by special police.

In April 2017, the constitutional amendments, which significantly increased the powers of Turkish President Recep Tayyip Erdogan, were narrowly accepted in the constitutional referendum.

In June 2018, President Erdogan  was re-elected for a new five-year term in the first round of the presidential election. His AK Party (AKP), Justice and Development Party  secured a majority in the separate parliamentary election.

In October 2018, Prince MBS of Saudi Arabia sent a group of government agents to murder prominent critic, Jamal Khashoggi. His death was just a few days before his sixtieth birthday.

In July 2022, the Turkish government asked the international community to recognise Turkey by its Turkish name Türkiye, in part because of the homonym, turkey (bird), for the name of the country in the English language.

See also 

 Outline of the Ottoman Empire
 History of Anatolia
 History of the Ottoman Empire
 History of Greece
 History of the Kurds

References

Bibliography

 Ahmad, Feroz. The Making of Modern Turkey (Routledge, 1993),
 Barkey, Karen. Empire of Difference: The Ottomans in Comparative Perspective. (2008) 357pp excerpt and text search
 Eissenstat, Howard. "Children of Özal: The New Face of Turkish Studies" Journal of the Ottoman and Turkish Studies Association 1#1 (2014), pp. 23–35 DOI: 10.2979/jottturstuass.1.1-2.23 online
 Findley, Carter V. The Turks in World History (2004) 
 Findley, Carter V. Turkey, Islam, Nationalism, and Modernity: A History (2011)
 Finkel, Caroline. Osman's Dream: The History of the Ottoman Empire (2006), standard scholarly survey excerpt and text search
 Freeman, Charles (1999). Egypt, Greece and Rome: Civilizations of the Ancient Mediterranean. Oxford University Press. .
 Goffman, Daniel. The Ottoman Empire and Early Modern Europe (2002) online edition
 Goodwin, Jason. Lords of the Horizons: A History of the Ottoman Empire (2003) excerpt and text search
 Hornblower, Simon; Antony Spawforth (1996). The Oxford Classical Dictionary. Oxford University Press.
 Hale, William. Turkish Foreign Policy, 1774–2000. (2000). 375 pp.
 Inalcik, Halil and Quataert, Donald, ed. An Economic and Social History of the Ottoman Empire, 1300–1914. 1995. 1026 pp.
 Kedourie, Sylvia, ed. Seventy-Five Years of the Turkish Republic (1999). 237 pp.
 Kedourie, Sylvia. Turkey Before and After Ataturk: Internal and External Affairs (1989) 282pp
 E. Khusnutdinova, et al. Mitochondrial DNA variety in Turkic and Uralic-speaking people. POSTER NO: 548, Human Genome Organisation 2002
 Kinross, Patrick). The Ottoman Centuries: The Rise and Fall of the Turkish Empire (1977) .
 Kosebalaban, Hasan. Turkish Foreign Policy: Islam, Nationalism, and Globalization (Palgrave Macmillan; 2011) 240 pages; examines tensions among secularist nationalism, Islamic nationalism, secular liberalism, and Islamic liberalism in shaping foreign policy since the 1920s; concentrates on era since 2003
 Kunt, Metin and Woodhead, Christine, ed. Süleyman the Magnificent and His Age: The Ottoman Empire in the Early Modern World. 1995. 218 pp.
 Lloyd, Seton. Turkey: A Traveller’s History of Anatolia (1989) covers the ancient period. 
 Mango, Andrew. Ataturk: The Biography of the Founder of Modern Turkey (2000) 
 Mango, Cyril. The Oxford History of Byzantium (2002). 
 Marek, Christian (2010), Geschichte Kleinasiens in der Antike C. H. Beck, Munich,   (review:  M. Weiskopf, Bryn Mawr Classical Review 2010.08.13).
 Ostrogorsky, George. History of the Byzantine State (1969). excerpt and text search
 Quataert, Donald. The Ottoman Empire, 1700–1922 (2005), standard scholarly survey excerpt and text search
 Shaw, Stanford J., and Ezel Kural Shaw. History of the Ottoman Empire and Modern Turkey. Vol. 2, Reform, Revolution, and Republic: The Rise of Modern Turkey, 1808–1975. (1977). excerpt and text search 
 Thackeray, Frank W., John E. Findling, Douglas A. Howard. The History of Turkey (2001) 267 pages online
 Vryonis, Jr., Speros. The Decline of Medieval Hellenism in Asia Minor and the Process of Islamization from the Eleventh through the Fifteenth Century (1971). 
 Zurcher,  Erik J. Turkey: A Modern History (3rd ed. 2004) excerpt and text search

 
Eurasian history
+
History of Europe
History of Western Asia